G63 may refer to:
 Bena language, a Bantu language of Tanzania
 Grumman G-63 Kitten I, an American experimental aircraft
 , a Royal Canadian Navy Tribal-class destroyer
 , a Royal Navy L-class destroyer
 Mercedes-Benz G63 AMG 6x6, a limited production AMG version of G-Class with six wheels